The AVC qualification for the 2014 FIVB Volleyball Men's World Championship saw member nations compete for four places at the finals in Poland.

Draw
29 AVC national teams entered qualification. (Yemen later withdrew) The teams were distributed according to their geographical positions. Teams ranked 1–5 in FIVB World Rankings did not compete in the zonal rounds, and automatically qualified for the final round. New Zealand also qualified automatically as the only registered team from Oceania.

Berths for final round

Subzonal round

Zonal round

Final round

The sixteen remaining teams were distributed according to their position in the FIVB Senior Men's Rankings as of 23 January 2013 using the serpentine system for their distribution. (Rankings shown in brackets)

Subzonal round

Western Asia 1
Venue:  Ghazir Club Court, Beirut, Lebanon
Dates: 7–9 June 2013
All times are Eastern European Summer Time (UTC+03:00).

|}

|}

Western Asia 2
Venue:  Yarmouk Club Hall, Kuwait City, Kuwait
Dates: 8 June 2013
All times are Arabia Standard Time (UTC+03:00).

|}

|}

Western Asia 3
Venue:  Mohammed Bin Hamad Al-Hitmi Hall, Doha, Qatar
Dates: 5–7 June 2013
All times are Arabia Standard Time (UTC+03:00).

|}

|}

Zonal round

Central Asia 1
Venue:  Astana Ice Palace, Pavlodar, Kazakhstan
Dates: 14–16 June 2013
All times are Almaty Time (UTC+06:00).

|}

|}

Central Asia 2
Venue:  Sugathadasa Indoor Stadium, Colombo, Sri Lanka
Dates: 3–5 July 2013
All times are Sri Lanka Standard Time (UTC+05:30).

|}

|}

Eastern Asia
Venue:  Taipei Gymnasium, Taipei, Chinese Taipei
Dates: 29 June 2013
All times are National Standard Time (UTC+08:00).

|}

|}

Southeastern Asia
Venue:  Nakhon Pathom Gymnasium, Nakhon Pathom, Thailand
Dates: 26–28 June 2013
All times are Indochina Time (UTC+07:00).

|}

|}

Western Asia 4
Venue:  Al-Shabab Indoor Stadium, Dubai, United Arab Emirates
Dates: 5–7 July 2013
All times are United Arab Emirates Standard Time (UTC+04:00).

|}

|}

Western Asia 5
Venue:  Isa Sports City Hall C, Riffa, Bahrain
Dates: 4–6 July 2013
All times are Arabia Standard Time (UTC+03:00).

|}

|}

Final round

Pool A
Venue:  AIS Arena, Canberra, Australia
Dates: 6–8 September 2013
All times are Australian Eastern Standard Time (UTC+10:00).

|}

|}

Pool B
Venue:  Azadi Volleyball Hall, Tehran, Iran
Dates: 11–13 September 2013
All times are Iran Daylight Time (UTC+04:30).

|}

|}

Pool C
Venue:  Chenzhou Olympic Sports Centre, Chenzhou, China
Dates: 20–22 September 2013
All times are China Standard Time (UTC+08:00).

|}

|}

Pool D
Venue:  Park Arena, Komaki, Japan
Dates: 5–8 September 2013
All times are Japan Standard Time (UTC+09:00).

|}

|}

References

2014 FIVB Volleyball Men's World Championship
2013 in volleyball